The Napanee Guide is a weekly newspaper in Napanee, Ontario.

History
Since its start in 1988 the paper has seen many changes, from an independent to a corporately-owned publication and from a shopper to an award-winning newspaper. It is part of the Postmedia chain of newspapers.

External links
 The Napanee Guide Official Website
 

Postmedia Network publications
Weekly newspapers published in Ontario
Newspapers established in 1988
1988 establishments in Ontario